DAC may refer to:

Places
 Shahjalal International Airport (IATA airport code: DAC), Dhaka, Bangladesh
 Dahinsara Junction railway station (station code: DAC), Gujarat, India

Fictional locations
 Dac (Star Wars)

People
António Félix da Costa (born 1991), Portuguese racing driver
 Deputy assistant commissioner in the Metropolitan Police, London, UK
 Jean Dac (1552–1615), German painter
 Pierre Dac (1893–1975), French humourist

Sports
 Dakota Athletic Conference, a former NAIA athletic conference
 Daskalakis Athletic Center, Drexel University
 Detroit Athletic Club, Detroit, Michigan, USA
 DAC 1904 Dunajská Streda, a Slovak football team
 Dota 2 Asia Championships or Dota 2015, Dota 2 tournament
 Dunajská Streda Athletic Club (DAC), Dunajská Streda, Slovakia; parent organization of FC DAC 1904 Dunajská Streda
 Duneland Athletic Conference, Indiana, USA

Transportation
 DAC (vehicle manufacturer), a Romanian truck manufacturer
 DAC (automobile), an American car manufactured 1922–1923 and the company that manufactured it
 Rocar DAC, a bus model series from Rocar
 DAC Air, defunct Romanian airline
 Direction de l'Aviation Civile, a government agency of Luxembourg
 Dutch Aeroplane Company, manufacturer of the DAC RangeR
 Digital automatic coupling for railways in Europe

Science and technology
 DAC (chemotherapy), regimen for AML
 DAC (operating system)
 Microsoft Data Access Components
 Diamond anvil cell, for producing very high pressures
 Digital-to-analog converter
 Direct air capture, for atmospheric carbon dioxide removal 
 Direct Attach Copper in 10 Gigabit Ethernet
 Discretionary access control, in computer security
 Double Acting Cylinder, a type of pneumatic cylinder

Organisations
 Designated activity company, a type of private company limited by shares in Ireland

 Danish Architecture Centre, a communication and development centre
 Davies Arnold Cooper, a predecessor law firm to British firm DAC Beachcroft
 Domain Assurance Council, a trade association
 De Anza College, a junior college in Cupertino, California
 Democratic Action Congress, a political party in Trinidad and Tobago
 Development Assistance Committee of the OECD
 Defense Ammunition Center, of US DoD
 Distributed autonomous corporation, with records maintained on a blockchain
 Direct Action Committee, UK peace campaign from 1957 until 1961

Other uses
 Design Automation Conference, on electronic design automation
 Deferred Acquisition Costs, in insurance
 Districtus Austriae Controllatus, a classification for Austrian wine
 Star Trek DAC, a Star Trek video game
 Domain Awareness Center
 Mumeng language (ISO 639 code: dac)

See also

 
 
 DACS (disambiguation)
 DAQ (disambiguation)
 DAK (disambiguation)
 Dack (disambiguation)